Ruhul Amin (born 12 March 1962) Bangladeshi Deobandi is an Islamic scholar and educator. He is currently serving as the Khatib of Baitul Mukarram National Mosque of Bangladesh in the capacity of State Minister. He is the Muhtamim of Gowhardanga Madrasa.

Early life 
Ruhul Amin was born on 12 March 1962 in Gowhardanga of Tungipara upazila of Gopalganj district. His father Shamsul Haque Faridpuri. He completed his primary education at Gowhardanga Madrasa, Hefz, Hadith (Masters) at Daora and Ifta.

Career 
Ruhul Amin has been the Muhtamim (vice chancellor) of Gowhardanga Madrasa since 2003. He is the President of Befaqul Madarisil Qawmia Gowhardanga Bangladesh and a permanent member of Al-Haiatul Ulya Lil-Jamiatil Qawmia Bangladesh, the highest authority of Qawmi Madrasa. On 31 March 2022, he was nominated Khatib of Baitul Mukarram National Mosque. He is the Governor of the Board of Government of the Islamic Foundation Bangladesh. 

He is the editor of the monthly Al-Ashraf. He assisted the court as Amicus Curiae, the country's top scholar in ruling on the validity of the fatwa. He was expecting the nomination of Awami League from Narail-1 constituency in the Eleventh Parliamentary Election. He was instrumental in the official recognition of the Qawmi Madrasa Charter.

References 

Living people
1962 births
Awami League politicians
Bangladeshi Sunni Muslim scholars of Islam
Hanafi fiqh scholars
20th-century Muslim scholars of Islam
People from Gopalganj District, Bangladesh
Khatib of the national mosque of Bangladesh
Deobandis
Bengali Muslim scholars of Islam